Belinda Caroline Stronach  (Born May 2, 1966) is a Canadian businesswoman, philanthropist and a former Member of Parliament (MP) in the House of Commons of Canada from 2004 to 2008. Originally elected as a Conservative, she later crossed the floor to join the Liberals. From May 17, 2005 to February 6, 2006, Stronach was the Minister of Human Resources and Skills Development and Minister responsible for Democratic Renewal in the government of Paul Martin. After leaving politics, she served as the executive vice-chairman of Magna International, Canada's largest automotive parts manufacturer until December 31, 2010.

Stronach is the Chairman, Chief Executive Officer and President  of The Stronach Group and the founder and chair of The Belinda Stronach Foundation, a Canadian charitable organization. She also co-founded Acasta Enterprises and served as its director until 2017 when she resigned from the board.

In the early 2000s, Stronach was highlighted by the World Economic Forum and media outlets, National Post and Fortune Magazine, as a promising future leader.

Background
Stronach was born in Newmarket, Ontario, as the daughter of Austrian parents, Elfriede Sallmutter and Magna International founder and chairman, Frank Stronach. She graduated from Newmarket High School and attended York University in 1985, where she studied business and economics, but dropped out after one year to work at Magna.

Business career
Stronach was a member of the board of directors of Magna from 1988 until 2004. She became a vice-president of the company in 1995 and executive vice-president in 1999, until her appointment as president and chief executive officer. She has chaired the boards of Decoma International Inc., Tesma International Inc., and Intier Automotive Inc., all in the auto parts sector. She was a founding member of the Canadian Automotive Partnership Council and served on the Ontario Task Force on Productivity, Competitiveness and Economic Progress. She previously served as a director of the Yves Landry Foundation, which furthers technological education and skills training in the manufacturing sector.

In February 2001, she was appointed chief executive officer of Magna, succeeding Donald J. Walker (who became CEO of Magna spinoff Intier Automotive Inc.), and in January 2002, she also became its president. While CEO, the company added 3,000 jobs in Canada, 1,000 of them being in the Newmarket-Aurora area she would later represent in Parliament. Under her leadership Magna had record sales and profits each year. Though he held no formal operational role during that time, Frank Stronach remained as chairman of the board.

As a CEO, Stronach was widely viewed as more conciliatory to organized labour than her father, who was noted for his strong opposition to unions at Magna. While head of Magna, she ceased fighting the United Auto Workers in a dispute before the National Labor Relations Board, and the union organized numerous Magna workers in the United States.

In December 2010, Stronach resigned her position as executive vice-chairman and her position as board member at Magna International Inc. in what the Toronto Star called "a surprise move that reflects a shift in boardroom power" after the Stronach family gave up control earlier in 2010.

After leaving Magna, together with her father, they created The Stronach Group in mid-2011. The Stronach Group is a horse racing, entertainment and pari-mutuel wagering technology company. The Stronach Group horse racing industry brands include; Santa Anita Park, "The Great Race Place"; Pimlico Race Course, home of the Preakness Stakes; Gulfstream Park, one of Florida's entertainment destination centres, and home to the $16-million Pegasus World Cup Invitational, the world's richest Thoroughbred horse race; Laurel Park; Golden Gate Fields; Portland Meadows; and Rosecroft Raceway.  The Stronach Group is in pari-mutuel technology through its subsidiaries AmTote and Xpressbet and is a distributor of horse racing content to audiences through Monarch Content Management.

Stronach, as Chairman, Chief Executive Officer and President  of The Stronach Group, has led initiatives for industry wide horse racing reforms focused on horse and rider safety and welfare.

In May 2012, Anthony Melman and Stronach announced a partnership and established Acasta Capital Inc. Stronach stepped away from Acasta in July 2017.

In February 2016, together with business partners Holly Fennell, and Canadian marketing executive Beverley Hammond, Stronach launched Age Quencher Solutions, a line of all-natural beauty products. Belinda Stronach divested of her shares in Age Quencher Solutions in late 2017.

On October 1, 2018, Frank Stronach and his wife filed a lawsuit against their daughter Belinda, her children Frank and Nicole, and Alon Ossip for non-compliance with commitments regarding the management of The Stronach Group (TSG), from which Frank Stronach resigned as trustee in 2013 when he ran for office in Austria.  The settlement to the lawsuit was announced on August 13, 2020. As part of the settlement, Belinda Stronach retains full control of The Stronach Group’s horse racing, gaming, real estate and related assets.

Philanthropy and honours

On November 9, 2006, she co-chaired the Millennium Promise Convention in Montreal with Canadian television personality Rick Mercer. This event was a national campaign to enlist Canadians to help protect children in Africa from the effects of malaria. Together, Stronach and Mercer co-founded Spread the Net, a grassroots organization that raises money to buy insecticide-treated bed nets for families in Africa, reducing the risk of getting malaria by a mosquito bite. For her efforts, Stronach received an honorary degree from Brock University in St. Catharines, Ontario in 2009.

In addition to Spread the Net, Stronach founded The Belinda Stronach Foundation in 2008. The foundation was established to support, develop and incubate socially innovative projects and events confronting challenges related to youth, girls and women, development, and health. The foundation established project-based partnerships with The Tony Blair Faith Foundation, The Clinton Global Initiative, ONE, The Canadian Club of Toronto, The Economic Club of Canada, Malaria No More, and several other domestic and international organizations.

In 2010, The Belinda Stronach Foundation brought the One Laptop Per Child Program to Canada. Now a standalone program, One Laptop Per Child Canada has delivered education technology to 9,000 Aboriginal students in 60+ communities in 9 provinces and 2 territories.

That same year, The Belinda Stronach Foundation developed and hosted the G(irls)20 Summit. Modeled after the G(20) Summit, The G(irls)20 Summit solicited grassroots ideas on how to reach the Millennium Development Goals (MDGs) that most impact girls and women. The G(irls)20 Summit was launched in Toronto in 2010, followed by Paris, France in 2011. Each was attended by one girl from each of the G20 countries, as well as a representative from the African Union. Delegates engaged in a conversation about the economic prowess of girls and women, culminating in the development of a communiqué outlining their recommendations on how to empower and engage girls and women globally. In France, the communiqué was received in person by Mme. Consuelo Remmert, aide to President Nicolas Sarkozy, with a promise to hand-deliver to the President's attention. The communiqué suggested that, if provided with the right platform, the voices of girls and women around the world could indeed be heard. After two successful summits, Toronto 2010 and France 2011, the G(irls)20 Summit became its own entity, separate from the foundation, and it continues to thrive today as an organization known as G(irls)20.

Recognizing a growing concern in her home community and surrounding municipalities, Stronach, together with Newmarket Mayor Tony Van Bynen, established Belinda's Place, an organization that works to provide hope for women without a home. Opened in November 2015, Belinda's Place is the first emergency and transitional housing facility for single homeless women in York Region. It provides potentially life-changing services that aim to promote dignity, stability and self-reliance.

On November 20, 2014, Stronach co-chaired Covenant House Toronto's Executive Sleep Out 2014 Edition with Tim Lieweke (MLSE President & CEO). Stronach, along with more than 80 other community and business leaders, spent the night sleeping outside to raise awareness and critical funds to support the programs and services that help youth transition from a life on the streets to a life of opportunity. The 2014 Sleep Out was the most successful in the three-year history, raising more than $939,000.

Personal life
Stronach is twice divorced; her first husband is former Magna CEO Donald J. Walker and her second Norwegian speed skater Johann Olav Koss. She has two children from her first marriage, Frank and Nicole Walker. Frank is a DJ performing as Frank Walker while Nicole is a world champion equestrian.

Jane Taber, writing in The Globe and Mail, reported that a party Stronach hosted was where the adult Justin Trudeau became re-acquainted with his future wife, Sophie Grégoire.

Cancer diagnosis
On June 23, 2007, the Toronto Star reported that Stronach had been diagnosed with ductal carcinoma in situ, a form of breast cancer, in April 2007, and had undergone a mastectomy on June 19 in an undisclosed Toronto hospital.

According to a September 14, 2007, article from CTV News, Stronach travelled to the United States for breast cancer surgery in June 2007. Stronach raised over a million dollars in funds for the Belinda Stronach Chair in Breast Cancer Reconstructive Surgery, at the University of Toronto, following her own breast surgery.

Political career

Early political career

In the 2000 Canadian Alliance leadership election, she supported Preston Manning. In his memoir Think Big, Manning recalls Stronach at his second-ballot campaign launch in Toronto delivering "a substantive introduction in which she clearly explained why she wanted the Alliance and my candidacy to succeed", and he later thanked her for "unflagging support" in that campaign.

Magna Budget
In 2003, Ontario Premier Ernie Eves had his Minister of Finance, Janet Ecker present the government's budget at a televised press conference at Magna's headquarters rather than before the Legislative Assembly of Ontario, as was the tradition.  The "Magna Budget" resulted in accusations that the government was trying to avoid the scrutiny of the legislature and was flouting centuries of parliamentary tradition in favour of a PR stunt.  Furthermore, the expense of this move was condemned as a waste of money considering that the legislative chamber was already equipped with video equipment for televised coverage.  Speaker Gary Carr, himself a Tory, ruled that by not presenting the budget before the legislature, the Eves government was prima facie in contempt of the legislature—a ruling that was later overturned by the full chamber.  The episode was a factor in the Tories' defeat in the provincial election held later that year.

Conservative leadership bid
Throughout the summer and into the fall of 2003, talks were undertaken by officials of the Canadian Alliance and Progressive Conservatives with respect to a merger of those parties. Vote-splitting between the two right-wing parties had enabled the Liberals to dominate Canadian politics for a decade. Meetings between the parties were overseen by a facilitator, who was later revealed to have been Stronach. She was among many who had called for PC leader Peter MacKay and Canadian Alliance leader Stephen Harper to undertake the merger talks in the first place.

In 2004, Stronach contested the leadership of the newly formed Conservative Party. As a candidate for leadership of the new party, she drew a great deal of publicity to the race. However, many in the media saw her first foray into politics as sophomoric. Some critics accused her of being a "manufactured candidate", dependent on a high-priced network of professional campaign staff and Magna associates.

Some of the media reaction to Stronach's candidacy was criticized. Casting Stronach as an "heiress" with a "coddled career" — to the point of joking comparisons to Paris Hilton— and the attention paid to her physical appearance and personal life, was described by a commentator as patronizing and sexist. Supporters touted her youth and style, corporate experience, private life as a "soccer mom", and her potential to win new and swing voters, especially moderate, socially progressive voters in the province of Ontario.

On February 11, 2004, she declined to participate in a debate between the Conservative party candidates, leaving Tony Clement and Stephen Harper to debate each other on a Canadian Broadcasting Corporation broadcast. She later also skipped a March 14 debate on the Global Television Network. She argued that she ought only to participate in party-sponsored debates, rather than picking and choosing among those organized by outside sponsors. Critics saw this as her way of avoiding a debate with the other two candidates.

In her major speech at the leadership convention on March 19, 2004, she promised to serve only two terms if she became prime minister and to draw no salary. She made a major gesture of "throwing away the script", but then undercut this when she was seen referring to cue cards. On March 20, 2004, she finished second to Harper with 35% of the vote.

In the 2004 federal election, she was narrowly elected as the MP for Newmarket—Aurora by a margin of 689 votes over Liberal Martha Hall Findlay. She was appointed the International Trade critic in the Official Opposition Shadow Cabinet.

Political positions as an MP
Before crossing the floor of the House of Commons, Stronach represented the socially progressive face of the Conservative Party. Along with Peter MacKay, she was seen as giving the Conservatives a more moderate image.

Stronach was generally to the left of her Conservative caucus colleagues, supporting abortion rights, gun control and same-sex marriage. During her Conservative leadership campaign, she called for a free vote in parliament, with votes cast individually and not along party lines, on same-sex marriage. She spoke and voted in favour of same-sex marriage when the issue came before the House of Commons in 2005; a position she re-affirmed as a Liberal in 2006. Social conservative elements in Canada were critical of Stronach, calling her a "Red Tory". During Stronach's leadership campaign, REAL Women of Canada said: "If Ms. Stronach is elected as leader of the Conservative Party, social conservatives will no longer have a voice in Canada." Stronach, for her part, promised after the leadership race that she would do her best to keep the party from moving too far to the right. She cited discomfort with Stephen Harper and the Conservatives' policies as one of her reasons for crossing the floor.

Stronach supported trade with the United States but said she would like to re-examine and review parts of the North American Free Trade Agreement (NAFTA) to ensure, in her view, that Canadians can stand on a more equal footing with U.S. competitors. During her leadership campaign she said the country needed to consider changes to the Medicare system that would respect the principles of the Canada Health Act "as our standard, not our straitjacket".

In May 2005, Stronach suggested publicly that forcing an early election, especially before passing that year's federal budget, was risky and could backfire on the Tories. Harper wanted to force an early election in the wake of testimony at the Gomery Commission damaging to the Liberals. The Tories planned to bring down the government by voting against an amendment to the budget that the Liberals had made to gain New Democratic Party (NDP) support. Since this would be a loss of supply, it would have brought down the government.

However, on May 17, 2005, two days before the crucial vote, Stronach announced that she was crossing the floor and joining the Liberal Party. Her decision to join the Liberals was facilitated by former Ontario Liberal Premier David Peterson. Stronach immediately joined the cabinet as Minister of Human Resources and Skills Development and Minister responsible for Democratic Renewal. In the latter portfolio, she was charged with overseeing the implementation of the Gomery Inquiry recommendations, upon their release. She championed the one-member, one-vote policy officially adopted by the Liberal Party of Canada in 2009 in an effort to democratize the Party's leadership election process.

Stronach is a strong advocate of women's issues. She was elected chair of the Liberal Women's Caucus and spearheaded the development of The Pink Book, a policy framework that advocated a series of proposals to deal with the most pressing social and economic issues facing Canadian women. In 2005, she won the "In Celebration of Women: Achievements and Initiatives" award, and in 2010 she received the EVE award from Equal Voice in recognition of her philanthropic and political contributions to the promotion of women in public life.

Her decision to quit the Conservative Party came after an uneasy relationship with Stephen Harper. In a press conference after leaving the party, she said that Harper was not sensitive to the needs of all parts of the country, and was jeopardizing national unity by allying himself with the Bloc Québécois to bring down the government. She also stated that the party was too focused on Western Canada and "Western alienation" instead of having a broader and more inclusive focus. She had other concerns about the Conservative attitude to Indigenous issues and that Stephen Harper was abandoning the historic Kelowna Accord negotiated by Paul Martin with First Nations' leaders and that Harper did not support an "urban agenda" that would recognize the challenges faced by Canada's Big Cities. Her dislike for Harper was obvious in her press conference with Martin; she never once referred to him by name, only as "the leader of the Conservative Party."

Stronach's move shifted the balance of power in Parliament and allowed Martin's Liberal minority government to survive for the time being. On May 19, 2005, two crucial confidence motions were voted on in the House of Commons. The first vote, on Bill C-43, the original budget proposal approved by all parties, was passed as expected, with 250 for and 54 against. The second vote was on a new budget amendment (Bill C-48) that included C$4.6 billion in additional spending the Liberals negotiated with NDP leader Jack Layton, to secure the support of NDP MPs. It was on this amendment that the Conservative/Bloc alliance planned to bring down the government. However, the vote resulted in a 152–152 tie. It then fell to the Speaker, Peter Milliken, to cast the deciding vote, which he cast in favour of continuing debate, resulting in the survival of the government. The vote carried with a final count of 153 for and 152 against. 

The Liberals used Stronach's defection to paint the Conservative Party as being too extreme for moderate voters in Ontario. The Liberals enjoyed a modest upswing in the polls after earlier being damaged by testimony from Gomery Commission. Some political pundits suggested that shortly after Stronach's defection would have been the ideal time for the Liberals to call the election, as Stephen Harper had lost some of his momentum after narrowly failing to bring down the government. Instead, the Liberals were forced into an election when they were brought down by a vote of non-confidence later that year, after revelations from the Gomery Inquiry damaged their popularity. Columnist Andrew Coyne suggested that while her defection helped the Liberals in the short-run to stay in power, it also made Martin appear as a "grasping conniver willing to do and say anything to hang onto power".

Reaction to Stronach's move
Stronach's party switch mere days before the confidence vote made her the target of criticism within the Conservative Party and in the media in general. Many were cynical about her reasons for leaving and believed that her move to the Liberals was motivated more by ambition than by moral or political principles. In a press conference following the announcement, Harper speculated that Stronach had left the party simply to further her own career. At the same time, others praised Stronach for having the courage to leave a party in which she no longer felt comfortable.

Considerable media attention was paid to Peter MacKay, MP, and the deputy leader of the Conservative Party, with whom Stronach had a relationship of several months. Interviewed the day after Stronach's departure from his party, he stated that he had learned of her intention to cross the floor mere hours before the public announcement. In an interview conducted at his father's farm, MacKay showed discernible emotion.

The day after Stronach crossed the floor, the reaction in Newmarket—Aurora was mixed. Some of her constituents were upset and expressed a sense of betrayal. Protesters picketed her riding office for several days, demanding a by-election. However some of her constituents supported her move because they did not want an election and supported the budget.

Stronach's move to the Liberal Party and the speed with which she was given a senior-level cabinet position renewed calls from both parliamentarians and the general public for legislation to prevent such "party-hopping." One month after Stronach crossed the floor, a private member's bill was tabled that would require a by-election to be held within thirty-five days of a member of parliament quitting a party. According to this proposed legislation, the MP would have to sit as an independent until the by-election. The legislation never became law.

NDP MP Pat Martin requested an investigation of Stronach, speculating that she had been promised a senior cabinet post in return for her defection. The Ethics Commissioner of Canada, Bernard Shapiro, refused to investigate her floor-crossing, citing that it was a constitutional right of a prime minister to appoint opposition members to Cabinet.

The Conservatives targeted Stronach for defeat in the 2006 election as part of their larger goal of a breakthrough in Ontario, especially in the Toronto suburbs (popularly known as the 905s). However, while the Conservatives won a minority government, Stronach defeated her Conservative challenger, Lois Brown, by an eight-point margin.

Characterisation in the media
Some of the criticism of Stronach's party switching also came under fire. Political scientist Linda Trimble has argued that the reaction to Stronach's defection to the Liberals was "offensive and sexist", referring to the comments of two provincial legislature members Ontario PC MPP Bob Runciman and Alberta PC Tony Abbott. Runciman told the Toronto radio station CFRB that, "She sort of defined herself as something of a dipstick, an attractive one, but still a dipstick." He apologized for his comments and later elaborated, saying that Stronach failed to adequately express her reasons for defecting from the Conservative Party. Abbott said that Stronach had "whored herself out for power." He apologized for the statement the next day saying that the term "whoring" had been misunderstood from context, and noting that it could be equally used for men and women.

Women's groups argued that the media also unfairly characterized the transition. The National Post used the front-page headline "Blonde Bombshell", and political cartoonists made reference to Stronach prostituting herself to the Liberal party.  Stronach's critics downplayed the sexism of their remarks and accused the Liberals of politicizing the issue to legitimize her crossing the floor.

She had defeated Lois Brown in the Conservative nomination election and barely won her seat in an extremely tight race against Martha Hall Findlay. Stronach's switch to the Liberals meant that Hall Findlay had to forfeit contesting the nomination process, while Lucienne Robillard lost one of her portfolios to Stronach.

Since she started her career in politics, Stronach has made several television appearances poking fun at herself. This includes appearances on the CBC television comedy This Hour Has 22 Minutes and a skate on the Rideau Canal with Rick Mercer for his series Rick Mercer Report. She also played a political reporter in the television mini-series H2O:The Last Prime Minister. In November 2005, she appeared on an episode of This Hour Has 22 Minutes. At one point in the show, she remarked "You know, I recommended to Stephen [Harper] once that to rise in his polls he should take a little Viagra but the pill got stuck in his throat and all he got was a stiff neck."

As a Liberal MP

Although the Liberals lost the 2006 federal election, Stronach won re-election as a Liberal candidate by a greater margin than she had in the 2004 election as a Conservative.

Following the Liberals' defeat in the 2006 election, Paul Martin announced that he would be stepping down as party leader. It was widely speculated that Stronach would seek the Liberal leadership at the 2006 leadership convention, having been endorsed by such Liberals as Reg Alcock and Brigitte Legault, who was head of the Quebec party's youth wing.

However, on April 6, 2006, she announced that she would not seek the leadership, citing her objections to the delegate-based selection process. "I could have raised the money, I was working on my French, but I realized that I was not going to be free to speak my mind on party renewal", said Stronach. She said that renewal would involve giving all party members a direct vote on its direction and leadership, among other things. "If there was a one-member, one-vote system, I would run." However, a report by CTV reporter Robert Fife suggested that her candidacy was hampered by her weak grasp of French, one of Canada's two official languages, and the fact that she believed the Liberals would be defeated in the next election. Several Liberal Party officials had also warned that they would enforce the new rules, which placed limits on donations and spending by contenders, which would have nullified Stronach's largest advantage over other potential rivals.

Not seeking re-election
On April 11, 2007, Stronach announced that she would not seek re-election, and would instead return to Magna International as executive vice-chairman. This decision came at a time when Magna was in the midst of teaming up with Onex Corporation to consider a bid to buy Chrysler. Stronach further cited her wish to spend more time with her growing children, and the creation of a personal foundation to end poverty and disease in Africa. She retained her seat in Parliament until the federal election in the fall of 2008.

On December 21, 2010, it was reported that Stronach was leaving Magna effective December 31 of that year.

References

Publication

External links 

 
 

1966 births
Living people
Businesspeople from Ontario
Canadian corporate directors
Canadian people of Austrian descent
Canadian women business executives
Canadian socialites
Women members of the House of Commons of Canada
Conservative Party of Canada MPs
Liberal Party of Canada MPs
Members of the House of Commons of Canada from Ontario
Members of the King's Privy Council for Canada
People from Newmarket, Ontario
Women in Ontario politics
Members of the 27th Canadian Ministry
21st-century Canadian women politicians
Women government ministers of Canada